Josef Schrammel, (3 March 1852 – 24 November 1895), was an Austrian composer and musician.

He was an illegitimate son of Kasper Schrammel and his later wife Alosia Ernst. Very early in his life, his father recognised the talent of Josef and sent them, despite financial hardship, to the Conservatory of the Gesellschaft der Musikfreunde (Society of Friends of Music in Vienna) where he received violin lessons. Later in his life, he travelled to the Orient. In 1878 Josef founded, along with his brother Johann Schrammel and a guitarist, a trio; the following year Anton Strohmayer replaced the first guitarist. This eventually, with the addition of clarinetist Georg Dänzer, became the famous Schrammel Quartet.

His grave is located in Hernals in Vienna.

Literature 

 Margarethe Egger: Die „Schrammeln“ in ihrer Zeit. Heyne, München 2000, .
 Stefan Winterstein (Hrsg.): Josef Schrammel im Serail. Die Aufzeichnungen des Wiener Volksmusikers über seine Reise in den Vorderen Orient 1869–1871. Schneider, Tutzing 2007, (Schriftenreihe zur Musik 11).
 Rudolf Alexander Moißl: Die Schrammel-Dynastie. St. Pöltner Zeitungs-Verlags-Gesellschaft, St. Pölten 1943.
 Alois Böck, Walter Deutsch: Das Werk der Brüder Schrammel. Einführung und Verzeichnis. Schneider, Tutzing 1993, (Schriftenreihe zur Musik 9).

External links
The Schrammel Brothers

1852 births
1895 deaths
19th-century classical composers
Musicians from Vienna
Austrian male classical composers
Austrian classical composers
19th-century male musicians